Kannadada Kotyadhipati is an Indian Kannada language quiz game show, produced by BIG Synergy.

Background
After a series of fresh ideas in reality and fiction shows the Star Network's Kannada general entertainment channel Asianet Suvarna has announced yet another path breaking reality show - Kannadada Kotyadhipati based on the most popular reality show Who Wants to be a Millionaire?. The show which is meant for a common Kannadiga is one for the biggest reality shows in Kannada television offering the prize money of Rs 1 crore. The format and the rules for the edition of Kannadada Kotyadhipati will be same as the  first edition of KBC. The show will be anchored by the actor Puneeth Rajkumar. Making his debut as an anchor for the first time on television Puneet Rajkumar expressed, "I am excited about being the anchor of this show which will give me an opportunity to interact closely with the common people. The format of the show is unique as this gives the common people an opportunity to use their knowledge and change their lives. Kannadada Kotyadhipati is produced by Big Synergy the same production house as KBC."

According to the Business Head of Suvarna, Anup Chandrasekharan,  "The Star Network originally brought in KBC to India and made it the most popular reality show in the country. We at Suvarna have the best ingredients to make Kannadada Kotiyadipati a successful show."

There is only one 1 Crore winner till now: Hussain Basha in the second season of the show.

Rules
The contestants must undergo an initial round of "Fastest Finger First", in which the host introduces the ten contestants of the episode and asks them all the same question. The contestants must then arrange the answers in the order described in the question. The contestant that places the four options in the correct order in the fastest time gets the chance to go on the hotseat.

Lifelines
A contestant can use a lifeline when he/she is undecided about which answer is correct. A lifeline can only be used once. The current lifelines in Kannadada Kotyadhipati:

Audience Poll: If the contestant uses this lifeline, it will result in the host repeating the question to the audience. The studio audience get 30 seconds to answer the question. Audience members use touch pads to designate what they believe the correct answer to be. After the audience have chosen their choices, the results are displayed to the contestant in percentages in bar-graph format and also shown on the monitors screens of the host and contestant, as well as the TV viewers.

Phone a Friend: If the contestant uses this lifeline, the contestant is allowed to call one of the three pre-arranged friends, who all have to provide their phone numbers in advance. The host usually starts off by talking to the contestant's friend and introduces him/her to the viewers. After the introduction, the host hands the phone call over to the contestant who then immediately has 30 seconds to ask and hope for a reply from their friend.

Double Dip ×2: If the contestant uses this lifeline,  the contestant is asked to choose two options among the four. If the contestant chooses an option that results in incorrect answer, he/she has another opportunity to opt among the remaining three options. There will be one correct answer and two incorrect at this situation. The contestant cannot quit the game if he/she uses this lifeline.

Notable celebrity guests
The following celebrities have played Kannadada kotyadhipati.

References

External links
 Newindianexpress.com
 247onlinenews.com
 Tvshows.sulekha.com
 Entertainment.oneindia.in

Indian game shows
Indian reality television series
Who Wants to Be a Millionaire?
Quiz shows
2012 Indian television series debuts
Kannada-language television shows
Star Suvarna original programming